Birgitte Price (earlier known as Birgitte Bruun; 29 April 1934 – 17 July 1997) was a Danish actress of the 1950s and 1960s.

Filmography
Det store løb (1952)
Far til fire (1953)
Farlig Ungdom (1953)
Father of Four in the Snow (1954)
En sømand går i land (1954)
Father of Four in the Country (1955)
Taxa K 1640 efterlyses (1956)
Father of Four in the City (1956)
Father of Four and Uncle Sofus (1957)
Bundfald (1957)
Mariannes bryllup (1958)
Father of Four and the Wolf Cubs (1958)
Verdens rigeste pige (1958)
Helle for Helene (1959)
Don Olsen kommer til byen (1964)
The Girl and the Millionaire (1965)
Der var engang (1966)
Kys til højre og venstre (1969)
Stine og drengene (1969)
Oh, to Be on the Bandwagon! (1972)
Katinka (1988)

External links

Birgitte Price, Den danske filmdatabase 
Birgitte Price, danskfilmogtv.dk 
Dansk Kvindebiografisk Leksikon 

1934 births
1997 deaths
Danish film actresses
Actresses from Copenhagen
20th-century Danish actresses